Synevyr National Nature Park is one of National Parks in Ukraine, located in Zakarpattia Oblast,  in southwest of the country. The Park has its headquarters in the town of Khust.

The Park contains a varied flora and fauna. Its attractions include Synevyr lake, and a brown bear sanctuary.

Since July 13, 2017, the Darvaika, Kvasovets, Strymba and Vilshany sections of the Synevyr National Park have been included in the UNESCO World Heritage List as one of the massifs of beech primeval forests of the Carpathians and other regions of Europe.

Gallery

Sources

 Географічна енциклопедія України : у 3 т. / редколегія: О. М. Маринич (відпов. ред.) та ін. — К. : «Українська радянська енциклопедія» ім. М. П. Бажана, 1989.

External links

 Official Web Site of Synevyr Park
 New Web Site of Synevyr Park

Parks in Ukraine
National parks of Ukraine
Protected areas established in 1974
1974 establishments in Ukraine
Primeval Beech Forests in Europe
Ramsar sites in Ukraine